Dawu County is a county of northeastern Hubei, People's Republic of China, bordering the prefecture-level city of Xinyang in Henan province to the north. It is under the administration of Xiaogan City.

Administrative divisions
Dawu County comprises 19 township-level divisions including 14 towns, 3 townships and 2 other areas.

Towns:
Chengguan, Yangping, Fangfan, Xincheng, Xiadian, Liuji, Hekou, Sigu, Lüwang, Huangzhan, Xuanhuadian, Fengdian, Daxin, Sanli

Townships:
Gaodian Township, Pengdian Township, Dongxin Township

Other areas:
Economic Development District, High speed Railway New Area

Climate

Notable people from Dawu County
 Cheng Shicai

References

 
Counties of Hubei
Xiaogan